B TV is an IPTV service in South Korea provided by SK Broadband. It provides a variety of Video On Demand TV content and Value Added Services using an IPTV Set top box connected to a Broadband Connection also provided by SK Broadband.

History 

 July 2006 – Launching B TV
 January 2007 – Launching Triple Play Service - (TV + Broadband Internet + Telephone)
 February 2007 – Launching Online Shopping Services
 April 2007 – Launching Value Added Service
 July 2007 – Reached 0.5 million subscribers
 April 2008 – Surpassed 0.9 million subscribers
 December 2011 – Launched a Linear TV service offering 80 Television channels

Content

BTV provides 25 VOD content categories
Korea Movies, English Movies, terrestrial TV channels (KBS, MBC, SBS), Kids, Entertainment, Primary Study, Mid-Grade Study, High-Grade Study, Language Study, Shopping, Animation, Series, Music, Certification, Sports, Documentary, Life, Leisure, News, Finance

BTV has contracts with 160 companies such as Sony Pictures, 20th Century Studios, Universal Studio, MGM, Paramount, Warner Bros, Disney, National Geographic, BBC Worldwide, Terrestrial TV, CJ Entertainment, Showbox, Movie Studios.

Providing JOY service (Value Added Service): Karaoke Channel, Media Center, SMS, Weather, Newspaper, etc.,

Technical Facts 

Platform :
H.264(MPEG4-Part10) encode 
Push & Download transport 
DRM security 
VOD Servers & Various VAS (Value Added Service) Servers 
Authorization, Billing & Management System

Network :
CDN (Contents Delivery Network)
Available for all kinds of connections (DSL/FTTx)

Terminal :
User-Friendly UI 
Support HD video & 5.1ch sound
Built-in HDTV tuner & Harddisk

References

External links
 , SK broadband site
 , B TV
 , South Korea site

Entertainment companies of South Korea